Namur is a province of Wallonia, one of the three regions of Belgium. It borders (clockwise from the West) on the Walloon provinces of Hainaut, Walloon Brabant, Liège and Luxembourg in Belgium, and the French department of Ardennes. Its capital and largest city is the city of Namur. As of January 2019, the province of Namur has a population of 494,325.

Subdivisions 

Economy 
The Gross domestic product (GDP) of the province was 13.5 billion € in 2018, accounting for 2.9% of Belgium's economic output. GDP per capita adjusted for purchasing power was 24,000 € or 80% of the EU27 average in the same year. GDP per person employed was 104% of the EU27 average.

List of governors

Twinning 
The Province of Namur is twinned with:
 Louga Region, Senegal
 Jiangsu Province, China
 Tunis Governorate, Tunisia

See also
County of Namur

References

External links

Province de Namur's official website

1830 establishments in Belgium
 
NUTS 2 statistical regions of the European Union
Provinces of Wallonia